Richard E. Banks (October 23, 1794 – May 6, 1856) was an American physician and surgeon.

Banks was born in Elbert County, Georgia. One of thirteen children, Banks was the only one to attend college. After attending the University of Georgia (for one year), he went to the University of Pennsylvania, where Banks received his medical M.D. degree.

After practicing in Philadelphia, Pennsylvania for a year, he returned to rural northeast Georgia and set up practice not far from his original home. Banks eventually moved to larger offices in Gainesville, Georgia. Banks traveled to treat settlers and Native Americans of northern Georgia and South Carolina.  He was especially noted for treating the Native Americans for smallpox.

Banks died in Gainesville on May 6, 1856 and was buried in Alta Vista Cemetery in that city. The Georgia General Assembly named Banks County in his honor on December 11, 1858.

References

This Day in Georgia History:October 23, Ed Jackson and Charly Pou, Carl Vinson Institute of Government, The University of Georgia
GeorgiaInfo Banks County State Historical Markers
History information from Official Banks County website
Rootsweb Banks County bio for Richard Banks

1794 births
1856 deaths
19th-century American physicians
Perelman School of Medicine at the University of Pennsylvania alumni
Banks County, Georgia
People from Elbert County, Georgia
People from Gainesville, Georgia